Aleksandras Kačanauskas (Kaunas 1882  – 16 November 1959 in Vilnius) was a Lithuanian composer, organist, singer (baritone), choir director and teacher.

Recordings
 Aleksandras Kačanauskas – Vokaliniai Kūriniai	Мелодия – С10-17607-8 Vinyl, LP	1982

References
 

1882 births
1959 deaths